Ali Illahism is a  syncretic religion which has been practiced in parts of Iranian Luristan which combines elements of Shia Islam with older religions. It centers on the belief that there have been successive incarnations of the Deity throughout history, and Ali Ilahees reserve particular reverence for Ali, the son-in-law of the Islamic prophet Muhammad, who is considered one such incarnation. Various rites have been attributed as Ali Ilahian, similarly to the Yezidis, Ansaris, and all sects whose doctrine is unknown to the surrounding Muslim and Christian population. Observers have described it as an agglomeration of the customs and rites of several earlier religions, including Zoroastrianism, historically because travelogues were "evident that there is no definite code which can be described as Ali Illahism".

Sometimes Ali-Illahism is used as a general term for the several denominations that venerate or deify Ali, like the Kaysanites, the Alawis or the Ahl-e Haqq/Yarsanis, others to mean the Ahl-e Haqq.

In Dabestan-e Mazaheb
The Dabestan-e Mazaheb "School of Religions", a 17th-century Persian book  about South Asian religions, presents the Ali Illahians as a sect that respected Muhammad and Ali and discarded the Quran, as it had been compiled under Umar. Its members were said to avoid killing animals and to believe that the rules allowing the killing of some animals had been created by Abu Bakr, Umar, Uthman ibn Affan and their followers.

See also 
 Anthropotheism
 Goran Kurds
 Ghulat
 Kurdish people
 Yarsanism

References

Iranian religions
Kurdish culture
Religion in Kurdistan
Monotheistic religions
Religion in Iran